Hypocharmosyna is a genus of parrots in the family Psittaculidae that are endemic to New Guinea, the Maluku Islands and the Bismarck Archipelago.

Taxonomy
The genus Hypocharmosyna was introduced in 1891 by the Italian zoologist Tommaso Salvadori with the red-flanked lorikeet as the type species. The genus was formerly considered as a junior synonym of the genus Charmosyna but following the publication of a molecular phylogenetic study in 2020, Hypocharmosyna was resurrected for two species belonging to a clade that was deeply divergent from other members of Charmosyna.

The genus contains two species:
 Red-fronted lorikeet (Hypocharmosyna rubronotata)
 Red-flanked lorikeet (Hypocharmosyna placentis)

References

 
Bird genera
Parrots of Oceania